The Boys Doubles tournament of the 2012 BWF World Junior Championships was held from October 30 until November 3. Nelson Heg Wei Keat and Teo Ee Yi from Malaysia were the winner of the last edition.

This edition, the title won by Hong Kong pair Lee Chun Hei and Ng Ka Long after beating Japanese pair Takuto Inoue and Yuki Kaneko 21-16, 21-17 in the final. This was the first title ever for Hong Kong.

Seeded

  Hafiz Faisal / Putra Eka Rhoma (third round)
  Arya Maulana Aldiartama / Edi Subaktiar (quarter-final)
  Lee Chun Hei / Ng Ka Long (champion)
  Wang Chi-lin / Wu Hsiao-lin (quarter-final)
  Rafiddias Akhdan Nugroho / Kevin Sanjaya Sukamuljo (third round)
  Antoine Lodiot / Julien Maio (third round)
  Takuto Inoue / Yuki Kaneko (final)
  Mathias Christiansen / David Daugaard (quarter-final)

Draw

Finals

Top Half

Section 1

Section 2

Section 3

Section 4

Bottom Half

Section 5

Section 6

Section 7

Section 8

References
Main Draw (Archived 2013-07-13)

2012 BWF World Junior Championships
2012 in youth sport